Golden tip may refer to
Goodia lotifolia, a shrub species in the pea family
Colotis hildebrandti, a butterfly from the genus Colotis endemic to Zambia, Malawi, and Kenya

Animal common name disambiguation pages